The following is a list of prominent Jewish astronomers of the Middle Ages, with the approximate periods of their activity, arranged in alphabetical order of first names.

 Source

Hebrew
Jews from al-Andalus
Medieval Islamic world-related lists